Alessandro Chiappini (born ) is a retired Italian volleyball coach. He was the coach of the Turkey women's national volleyball team. The team participated at the 2007 Women's European Volleyball Championship and won the silver medal at the 2009 Mediterranean Games.

References

1969 births
Living people
Italian volleyball coaches
Place of birth missing (living people)
Sportspeople from Perugia
Turkey women's national volleyball team coaches